Satureja is a genus of aromatic plants of the family Lamiaceae, related to rosemary and thyme. It is native to North Africa, southern and southeastern Europe, the Middle East, and Central Asia. A few New World species were formerly included in Satureja, but they have all been moved to other genera. Several species are cultivated as culinary herbs called savory, and they have become established in the wild in a few places.

Description
Satureja species may be annual or perennial.

Ecology and cultivation
Satureja species are food plants for the larva of some Lepidoptera (butterflies and moths). Caterpillars of the moth Coleophora bifrondella feed exclusively on winter savory (S. montana).

Savory may be grown purely for ornamental purposes; members of the genus need sun and well-drained soil.

Uses
 
Both summer savory (Satureja hortensis) and winter savory (Satureja montana) are used to flavor food. The former is preferred by cooks but as an annual is only available in summer; winter savory is an evergreen perennial.

Savory plays an important part in Armenian, Georgian, Bulgarian and Italian cuisine, particularly when cooking beans. The modern spice mixture Herbes de Provence has savory as one of the principal ingredients.

In Azerbaijan, savory is often incorporated as a flavoring in black tea.

Species

 Satureja adamovicii Šilic – Balkans
 Satureja aintabensis P.H.Davis – Turkey
 Satureja amani P.H.Davis – Turkey
 Satureja atropatana Bunge – Iran
 Satureja avromanica Maroofi – Iran
 Satureja bachtiarica Bunge – Iran
 Satureja boissieri Hausskn. ex Boiss. – Turkey, Iran
 Satureja bzybica Woronow – Caucasus
 Satureja × caroli-paui G.López – Spain  (S. innota × S. montana)
 Satureja cilicica P.H.Davis – Turkey
 Satureja coerulea Janka – Bulgaria, Romania, Turkey
 Satureja cuneifolia Ten – Spain, Italy, Greece, Albania, Yugoslavia, Iraq
 Satureja × delpozoi Sánchez-Gómez, J.F.Jiménez & R.Morales – Spain  (S. cuneifolia × S. intricata var. gracilis)
 Satureja edmondii Briq. – Iran
 A recent study found the essential oils of Satureja edmondii have antimicrobial properties and can protect food from S. aureus. The test was conducted on commercial soup products.
 Satureja × exspectata G.López – Spain  (S. intricata var. gracilis × S. montana)
 Satureja fukarekii Šilic – Yugoslavia
 Satureja hellenica Halácsy – Greece
 Satureja hortensis L. – summer savory – Italy, Bulgaria, Albania, Yugoslavia, Crimea, Caucasus, Altai Republic, Kazakhstan, Xinjiang, western Himalayas; naturalized in western Mediterranean, Persian Gulf sheikdoms, Cuba, Dominican Republic, scattered locations in United States
 The heterogeneous mixture of the Satureja hortensis L. essential oil in water serves as a natural herbicide. The addition of this mixture inhibits the root elongation of weeds which reduces the weed's root-to-shoot ratio. This further reduces the weed's cell division and inhibits its germination, growth, and physiological processes.
 Satureja horvatii Šilic – Greece, Yugoslavia
 Satureja icarica P.H.Davis – Greek Islands
 Satureja innota (Pau) Font Quer – Spain
 Satureja intermedia C.A.Mey. – Iran, Caucasus
 Satureja intricata Lange – Spain
 Satureja isophylla Rech.f. – Iran
 Satureja kallarica Jamzad – Iran
 Satureja kermanshahensis Jamzad – Iran
 Satureja khuzistanica Jamzad – Iran
Essential oils of Satureja khuzistanica have been shown to have anti-inflammatory properties which can be useful in medical treatments. A recent study found that higher concentrations of essential oils of Satureja khuzistanica  helped reduce adverse effects of traumatic brain injuries in rats. 
 Satureja kitaibelii Wierzb. ex Heuff. – Bulgaria, Romania, Yugoslavia
 Satureja laxiflora K.Koch – Iran, Iraq, Turkey, Caucasus
 Satureja linearifolia (Brullo & Furnari) Greuter – Cyrenaica region of Libya
 Satureja macrantha C.A.Mey. – Iran, Iraq, Turkey, Caucasus
 Satureja metastasiantha Rech.f. – Iraq
 Satureja montana L. – winter savory – southern Europe, Turkey, Syria
 Satureja mutica Fisch. & C.A.Mey. – Caucasus, Iran, Turkmenistan
 Satureja nabateorum Danin & Hedge – Jordan
 Satureja × orjenii Šilic – Yugoslavia     (S. horvatii × S. montana)
 Satureja pallaryi J.Thiébaut – Syria
 Satureja parnassica Heldr. & Sart. ex Boiss. – Greece, Turkey
 Satureja pilosa Velen. – Italy, Greece, Bulgaria
 Satureja rumelica Velen. – Bulgaria
 Satureja sahendica Bornm. – Iran
 Satureja salzmannii (Kuntze) P.W.Ball – Morocco, Spain
 Satureja spicigera  (K.Koch) Boiss. – Turkey, Iran, Caucasus
 Satureja spinosa L. – Turkey, Greek Islands including Crete
 Satureja subspicata Bartl. ex Vis. – Austria, Yugoslavia, Albania, Bulgaria, Italy
 Satureja taurica Velen. – Crimea
 Satureja thymbra L. – Libya, southeastern Europe from Sardinia to Turkey; Cyprus, Lebanon, Palestine
 Satureja thymbrifolia Hedge & Feinbrun – Israel, Saudi Arabia
 Satureja visianii Šilic. – Yugoslavia
 Satureja wiedemanniana (Avé-Lall.) Velen. – Turkey

Formerly in Satureja
 Browne's savory, Clinopodium brownei (as Satureja brownei)
 San Miguel Savory, Clinopodium chandleri (as Satureja chandleri)
 Large-flowered calamint, Clinopodium grandiflorum (as Satureja grandiflora)
 Stone mint, Cunila mariana (as Satureja origanoides)
Satureja acinos (L.) Scheele = Clinopodium acinos (L.) Kuntze
 Satureja alpina (L.) Scheele =  Clinopodium alpinum (L.) Kuntze
 Satureja biflora (Buch.-Ham. ex D.Don) Benth = Micromeria biflora (Buch.-Ham. ex D.Don) Benth
 Satureja gillesii (Graham) Briq. = Clinopodium chilense (Benth.) Govaerts
 Satureja mexicana  (Benth.) Briq. = Clinopodium mexicanum (Benth.) Govaerts
 Satureja multiflora (Ruiz & Pav.) Briq. – Chilean shrub mint = Clinopodium multiflorum (Ruiz & Pav.) Kuntze
 Satureja palmeri  (A.Gray) Briq. (believed extinct; rediscovered 2001) = Clinopodium palmeri (A.Gray) Kuntze
 Satureja paradoxa (Vatke) Engl. ex Seybold = Clinopodium paradoxum (Vatke) Ryding
 Satureja robusta (Hook.f) Brenan = Clinopodium robustum (Hook.f) Ryding
 Satureja viminea L. – serpentine savory = Clinopodium vimineum (L.) Kuntze
 Satureja vulgaris (L.) Fritschl = Clinopodium vulgare L.
 Satureja vernayana Brenan = Clinopodium vernayanum (Brenan) Ryding
 Satureja douglasii (Benth.) Briq. – yerba buena (syn. S. chamissonis) = Micromeria douglasii Benth

Etymology

The etymology of the Latin word "satureia" is unclear. Speculation that it is related to saturare, to satyr, or to za'atar is not well supported. The ancient Hebrew name is Tzatrah צתרה.

Notes

Lamiaceae
Lamiaceae genera
Herbs
Taxa named by Carl Linnaeus
Flora of Kurdistan
Flora of the Mediterranean Basin
Mediterranean cuisine